Johnson Park is a 473-acre (191 ha) linear park that runs along the northern banks of the Raritan River in the towns of Piscataway and Highland Park, New Jersey.

Paths through the park help to connect the East Coast Greenway.

East Jersey Olde Towne Village is adjacent.

References

External links
Johnson Park

Highland Park, New Jersey
Parks in Middlesex County, New Jersey
Piscataway, New Jersey